Hippeutister is a genus of clown beetles in the family Histeridae. There are about six described species in Hippeutister.

Species
These six species belong to the genus Hippeutister:
 Hippeutister amabilis (Wenzel, 1938)
 Hippeutister californicus Caterino & Tishechkin, 2008
 Hippeutister castaneus (Lewis, 1891)
 Hippeutister manicatus (Lewis, 1891)
 Hippeutister plaumanni Reichensperger, 1936
 Hippeutister solisi Caterino & Tishechkin, 2008

References

Further reading

 
 
 

Histeridae
Articles created by Qbugbot